Corporal Milton Blickensderfer (May 20, 1835 to May 17, 1916) was an American soldier who fought in the American Civil War. Blickensderfer received the country's highest award for bravery during combat, the Medal of Honor, for his action at Petersburg, Virginia on 3 April 1865. He was honored with the award on 10 May 1865.

Biography
Blickensderfer was born in Lancaster, Pennsylvania. Before the war, he resided in Tuscarawas county with his wife, Mary, and three children. He enlisted into the 126th Ohio Infantry in 1862 at Shanesville, Ohio. During the siege of Petersberg, Blickensderfer captured a Confederate battle flag, an act for which he was awarded the Medal of Honor. He died on 17 May 1916 in Tuscarawas County, Ohio and his remains are interred at Sugar Creek, Ohio.

Medal of Honor citation

See also

List of American Civil War Medal of Honor recipients: A–F

References

1835 births
1916 deaths
People of Ohio in the American Civil War
Union Army officers
United States Army Medal of Honor recipients
American Civil War recipients of the Medal of Honor
People from Lancaster, Pennsylvania
People from Tuscarawas County, Ohio
Military personnel from Pennsylvania